, is a Japanese actress and model associated with Hello! Project and best known as a former member of the pop group Morning Musume. She was the leader of the Japanese pop idol trio v-u-den until June 2008. She has performed as a solo singer, as a member of the Japanese pop idol group Ongaku Gatas, in the pop duo Hangry & Angry as Angry, and as a current member of Dream Morning Musume.

Biography

Career
Rika Ishikawa was born on January 19, 1985, in Yokosuka, Kanagawa, Japan.

Ishikawa joined Morning Musume as a fourth generation member along with Hitomi Yoshizawa, Nozomi Tsuji, and Ai Kago, and made her debut in 2000 along with the rest of the fourth generation on the band's tenth single, "Happy Summer Wedding".

In 2001, simultaneously with her Morning Musume obligations, Ishikawa became a featured member of the then-semi-dormant Hello! Project pop group Country Musume and a second-generation member of Morning Musume's first subgroup, Tanpopo.  She also participated in her first shuffle group, 3-nin Matsuri, with fellow Morning Musume/Tanpopo member Ai Kago and solo singer Aya Matsuura (previously, she had acted as a replacement member in the 2000 shuffle group Aoiro 7).

One of Ishikawa's most referenced vocal parts during her Morning Musume days was a frantic spoken-word piece in the middle eight of their 2003 single "Shabondama".  She also performed a spoken-word piece at the end of the song "The Peace!", which she has said was one of her favorite Morning Musume moments.

In September 2004, her new trio, v-u-den, released their debut single. She graduated from Morning Musume on May 7, 2005, and after five singles, v-u-den finally released their debut album, Suiteroom Number 1, in November 2005.

Ishikawa has starred in a Hamtaro movie with her Ecomoni partner, Sayumi Michishige, and soloist Aya Matsuura. She was a Pocky Girl (for Morning Musume's Pocky commercial), and also plays for Gatas Brilhantes H.P.

Ishikawa graduated from Morning Musume on the last day of the Morning Musume Concert Tour 2005 Haru ~Dai 6 Kan Hit Mankai!~, on May 7, 2005. During this concert, 7th generation member Kusumi Koharu was officially introduced into Morning Musume and replaced her spot. After her graduation, she replaced Nakazawa Yuko as the host of Hello!Morning till it ended in 2007.

Ishikawa starred in Sukeban Deka: Codename = Asamiya Saki, the fourth live-action adaptation film of Sukeban Deka opposite Aya Matsuura, released September 30, 2006.

In mid-2007, Ishikawa joined the Japanese idol group Ongaku Gatas along with fellow members of Gatas Brilhantes H.P..

On October 12, 2008, it was announced that she is paired up with fellow ex-Morning Musume member Hitomi Yoshizawa in the new unit Hangry & Angry in collaboration with a Harajuku fashion store of the same name. Hangry & Angry will be making their first United States performance at Sakura-Con in Seattle, Washington in April 2009.

It was announced on October 19, 2008, on the official Hello!Project website, that Ishikawa will graduate from Hello! Project along with the rest of Elder Club on March 31, 2009. Ishikawa joined the newly formed group, "Dream Morning Musume" in 2010 alongside other former Morning Musume members.

On January 1, 2010, Ishikawa opened up an official blog.

Personal life 
On March 13, 2017, she married a professional baseball player, Ryoma Nogami and gave birth to a baby boy sometime in late April 2018. He was followed by another boy in January 2020.

Groups

Hello! Project 
 Ongaku Gatas (2007 – present)
 Ecomoni (2004 – present)
 v-u-den (2004 – June 2008)
 DEF.DIVA (2005–2006)
 Morning Musume (2000–2005)
 Morning Musume Otomegumi (2003–2004)
 Tanpopo (2000–2003)
 Country Musume ni Ishikawa Rika (Morning Musume) (2001–2003)
 Romans (2003)
 Shuffle Groups
 3-nin Matsuri (2001)
 Sexy 8 (2002)
 7Air (2003)
 H.P. All Stars (2004)

Non-Hello! Project 
 Hangry & Angry (2008 – present)
 Dream Morning Musume (2011–present)
 Abcho (2012–present)

Releases

Photobooks

DVDs

Acts

Television

Radio

Movies 
 2000 – Pinch Runner
 2002 – Tokkaekko
 2003 – Koinu Dan no Monogatari
 2003 – 17sai ~Tabidachi no Futari~
 2004 – Tottoko Hamtaro Hamu Hamu Hapa Radaicho!
 2006 – Yo-Yo Girl Cop

Commercials 
 Eeruseeme
 2003 – J Beef "Oniku Suki Suki"

References

External links 
 Official blog
 Profile at UP-FRONT AGENCY (archived on 18 October 2004)
 Official Hangry & Angry website (archived on 8 February 2010)

1985 births
7Air members
Country Musume members
Def.Diva members
Japanese women pop singers
Japanese child singers
Japanese female models
Japanese female idols
Dream Morning Musume members
Living people
Morning Musume members
People from Yokosuka, Kanagawa
Tanpopo members
V-u-den members
Japanese stage actresses
Japanese radio personalities
Musicians from Kanagawa Prefecture